Hampden is a town in the Canadian province of Newfoundland and Labrador. The town has a population of 429. Two islands can be seen from the shore of Hampden, Granby Island and Millers Island. The latter is much closer to the town and is the host of a tuberculosis grave-site.

History
Hampden was named after English politician John Hampden.

Many communities were resettled into Hampden after the island was brought into Canadian Confederation on 31 March 1949, where the Joey Smallwood government pushed a resettlement plan that involved over 300 villages and 28,000 people.

Hampden was and still is to this day a logging and lumber town.  Over the years many companies cut logs for lumber mills and pulpwood for paper mills.  Thousands of cords of wood was boomed to the Bottom(furthest point south in White Bay) at an early time (1920s - 1930s) it was debarked and loaded aboard ships for England for the International Paper Company of Newfoundland.  Later (1940s - 1970s) it was loaded on to trucks and brought to the Humber River at Riverside where it was dumped into the river and floated down the river to the Bowater’s Paper Mill in Corner Brook.

To this day Hampden still relies of the logging industry as it main source of employment, Burton’s Cove Logging and Lumber Limited is the largest employer in the White Bay South area, employing forty plus employees year round.

Demographics 

See also
 List of cities and towns in Newfoundland and Labrador

References

Towns in Newfoundland and Labrador
Populated coastal places in Canada